The 2009 UNGL Draft was the inaugural draft for the United National Gridiron League. The draft was held on January 8–9, 2009. What made this draft unique was the fact that the league chose to skip having a rookie combine and held the draft online, in order to start the league in the spring of 2009. The first overall selection of the draft was UAB running back Dan Burks by the Alabama Blackbirds. The following is an incomplete list of players selected in the 2009 UNGL Draft.

Players included in the draft
Included in the draft where players from other leagues, such as the All-American Football League (AAFL), Arena Football League (AFL), American Indoor Football Association (AIFA), Continental Indoor Football League (CIFL), arenafootball2 (af2), Indoor Football League (IFL), and some from practice squads of National Football League (NFL) franchises.

Draft by position

Quarterback

Running back

Fullbacks

* After draft, joined af2.

Wide receivers

Tight ends

Offensive line

Defensive end

Defensive tackle

Linebacker

Cornerback

Safety

Kicker

Punter

References

United National Gridiron League